Simisola Bolatito Kosoko  (née Ogunleye; born April 19, 1988), better known by her stage name Simi, is a Nigerian singer, songwriter, and actress. She started her career as a gospel singer, releasing her debut studio album in 2008, titled Ogaju. She also played as one of the top judges in season 7 of the Nigerian idol TV show in 2022. She gained public recognition in 2014 after releasing "Tiff", a song that was nominated for Best Alternative Song at The Headies 2015. Simi signed a record deal with X3M Music in 2014, but left the label in May 2019 following the expiration of her contract. She released her second studio album Simisola on September 8, 2017. Her third studio album Omo Charlie Champagne, Vol. 1 was released to coincide with her thirty-first birthday on April 19, 2019. She launched her record label Studio Brat in June 2019.

Early life 
Simi was born on 19 April 1988 in Ojuelegba, a suburb of Surulere, Lagos State, as the last of four children. In an interview with Juliet Ebirim of Vanguard newspaper, Simi revealed that her parents separated when she was 9 years old. She also revealed that she grew up as a tomboy.

Education 
Simi attended Stars International College, a secondary school in Ikorodu, Lagos State. She is an alumna of Covenant University, where she studied mass communication.

Career

2006–13: Career beginnings and Ogaju
Simi grew up dancing and singing as a member of her local church's choir. She wrote her first song at age 10. Her professional music career started in 2008 following the release of her debut studio album Ogaju, which consisted of a variety of songs such as "Iya Temi" and "Ara Ile". The album was produced entirely by Samklef.

2014–2018: Restless, Chemistry and Simisola
In January 2014, Simi released the 5 track EP Restless, which eventually earned her a record deal with X3M Music. The EP is composed mostly of covers recorded by popular acts, including Rihanna's "Man Down" and Adele's "Set Fire to the Rain".

On January 9, 2014, Simi released two singles "Tiff" and "E No Go Funny". Both songs received frequent airplay and were met with generally positive reviews from critics. The video for "Tiff" was directed by Josh Clarke and released on August 30, 2015. The song was nominated for Best Alternative Song at the 2015 edition of The Headies.

Later in 2015, Simi won the Most Promising Act to Watch category at the 2015 Nigeria Entertainment Awards. In an interview with Leadership newspaper, Simi revealed that she started working on her second studio album, which was slated for release in 2016. Upon releasing "Jamb Question", Simi was listed as one of the artistes to watch out for in 2016 by NotJustOk. The remix of "Jamb Question" features Nigerian rapper Falz.

On February 14, 2016, Simi released the Oscar Heman Ackah-produced love ballad "Love Don't Care". It received frequent radio airplay and was met with positive reviews. "Love Don't Care" effectively addresses tribalism and discrimination in Nigeria. The song's music video was directed by Clarence Peters. In October 2016, Simi was nominated for Best Breakthrough Act at the MTV Africa Music Awards. On October 27, Simi collaborated with Falz to release the extended play Chemistry. Oghene Michael of 360 Nobs described the EP as an "experiment of the word art". In December 2016, Simi was nominated in three categories at The Headies 2016, winning one.

In anticipation of her 12-track second studio album Simisola, Simi released two singles; "Smile for Me" and "Joromi". Both songs were accompanied by music videos directed by Clarence Peters and Aje Films, respectively. Music videos for "O Wa Nbe", "Complete Me", "Gone for Good" and "Aimasiko" were also released to further promote the album. Simi unveiled the album's track listing on September 1, 2017. Simisola was released seven days later and debuted at number 5 on the Billboard World Albums chart.

2019: Omo Charlie Champagne, Vol. 1 and Studio Brat
In March 2019, Simi disclosed that she would be releasing her third studio album Omo Charlie Champagne, Vol. 1 to coincide with her birthday on April 19, 2019. She disclosed this information in a series of social media messages. The album is a slight departure from the relatively afro-centric feel of Simisola (2017). It is a mixture of sentimental ballad, Afropop, Afro-fusion, Afro-soul, R&B, EDM and moombahton. The 13-track album features guest vocals from Patoranking, Maleek Berry, Falz, and her husband Adekunle Gold. Its production was primarily handled by Oscar, with additional production from Vtek, Legendury Beatz, and Sess. Simi dedicated the album to her father Charles Oladele Ogunleye, who died in 2014. Omo Charlie Champagne, Vol. 1 was preceded by three singles: "I Dun Care", "Lovin" and "Ayo".

In May 2019, X3M Music announced Simi's departure following the expiration of her recording contract. Both parties did not renew the contract and agreed to part ways. In June 2019, Simi announced the launch of her independent record label, Studio Brat.

She released a song titled 'Duduke' in the year 2020 making her unborn baby, a symbol of love and hope.

2020: Restless II EP 
In 2020, Simi released another EP titled Restless II which is part two of the initial Restless EP released in 2014.

2022: TBH (To Be Honest) album 
The Studio Brat headliner, Simisola Kosoko, highly identified by her stage name Simi has recently unlocked her much anticipated studio project captioned "To Be Honest" album.

TBH (To Be Honest) is the fourth studio album by the Nigerian singer, Simi, and a follow-up to her current EP, "Restless II" which was launched in 2020.

The body of work TBH (To Be Honest) houses 11 stable tracks and has the likes of Fave, Deja, and naturally her husband, Adekunle Gold.

Her achievement on this studio project stretched to her selection as Spotify EQUAL Africa music program ambassador for July. She become the second African artiste after Tiwa Savage, to be named an EQUAL global and EQUAL African artiste.

The Spotify EQUAL program aims to foster gender equality and provide a platform to celebrate influential female artists. She joins a list of talented African women who are driving the culture and breaking through barriers in the music industry.

Artistry
Apart from being a singer and songwriter, Simi is also a sound engineer. She is credited with mixing and mastering Adekunle Gold's debut studio album Gold, which was released in July 2016. Her music style is basically hinged in the rhythm and blues, soul and hip hop music genres.

Personal life
Simi married a singer named Adekunle Gold in a private wedding ceremony on January 9, 2019. It was later revealed that they had been dating for five years. Simi became a mother for the first time on the 30th of May 2020 when she gave birth to her daughter Adejare.

Filmography 
She made her acting debut in Kunle Afolayan's directorial Mokalik.

Films

 Mokalik (2019)

Discography

Studio albums
Ogaju (2008)
Chemistry (with Falz) (2016)
Simisola (2017)
Omo Charlie Champagne, Vol. 1 (2019)
To Be Honest (2022)

EPs
Restless (2014)
Restless II (2020)

Selected singles

Awards and nominations

Academic writings about Simi
Adebayo, Abidemi Olufemi. "Culture Shift and Simisola Ogunleye's (Simi's) Conception of the Millennial African Woman in Love Don't Care and Joromi." Ibadan Journal of English Studies 7 (2018): 173–184.

See also 
List of Nigerian musicians

References

External links

Living people
Yoruba-language singers
Musicians from Lagos
Covenant University alumni
21st-century Nigerian women singers
Nigerian women singer-songwriters
Yoruba women musicians
English-language singers from Nigeria
Contemporary R&B singers
Nigerian rhythm and blues singers
Alternative rock singers
Soul musicians
1988 births
Yoruba actresses
21st-century Nigerian actresses
Actresses from Lagos
Nigerian film actresses
Nigerian women singers